"On" (stylized in all caps) is a song recorded by South Korean boy band BTS. It was released on February 21, 2020, as the second single from the band's fourth Korean-language album Map of the Soul: 7. A version featuring Australian singer Sia was also released and features on the digital and streaming version of the album.

Background and release
On January 7, 2020, BTS announced their fourth Korean-language studio album Map of the Soul: 7. The following day, the group shared a "comeback" map revealing a schedule split into four phases, with two singles. The first of which, "Black Swan" was released on January 17, 2020. Exactly a month later, the group released the album's tracklist, revealing "On" as the album's lead single and a remix of the song featuring Australian singer Sia. According to Big Hit, the group organized the collaboration."On" and the remix with Sia were made available for Music download and streaming in various locations on February 21, 2020, through Big Hit. The tracklist for BTS' fourth Japanese studio album Map of the Soul: 7 ~ The Journey ~, was published on May 8, and included a Japanese version of "On". The track was made available digitally simultaneously with the album on July 14, 2020, through Def Jam, Virgin and Big Hit.

Composition
"On" was written by RM, August Rigo, Melanie Fontana, Michel Schulz, Suga, J-Hope, Antonina Armato, Krysta Youngs, Julia Ross, and its producer Pdogg. The song is composed in the key of A minor in a tempo of 106 beats per minute and runs for 4:06. Lyrically, the song talks about how their success changed their lives, the sacrifices that they have made, and having the strength to continue their career despite "the unknown future."

Reception
In her review for Clash magazine, Deb Aderinkomi called "On" a "quintessential BTS song". Jae-Ha Kim of Variety, described the song as "anthemic, stadium-ready quality". Writing for Time, Raisa Bruner noted that "On is already massive, kicking off with gospel-influenced organ, featuring propulsive percussion and a snare drum sing-along and tearing things up with an uplifting refrain" but Sia's presence "speaks to their ambitions to be taken seriously as a chart-topping pop act, regardless of language".

Promotion
On February 19, it was announced that the band would release a 30-second video teaser of the lead single on TikTok, 12 hours ahead of the official release of the song on February 21. The day after the song release, a Commentary Film was released showing the work UCLA Herb Alpert School of Music's Bruin Marching Band directors and team members had in the production of some of the songs on the album, and the essence of BTS' message.

The band performed the song at the main concourse of Grand Central Station on The Tonight Show Starring Jimmy Fallon on February 24, 2020, for what has been called "one of the most high-production episodes" of the show. They also appeared in the Carpool Karaoke segment on The Late Late Show with James Corden.

Commercial performance
In South Korea, "On" debuted at number eleven on the eighth issue of the Gaon Digital Chart, for the period February 16–22, with less than two days of tracking. The following week, the single reached number one, becoming BTS' sixth track to do so. It spent six weeks in the chart's top ten and was the 22nd best-performing song of February, peaking at number four on the Gaon Monthly Chart in March 2020. On the Billboard K-pop Hot 100, the single debuted at number 41 on the chart issue dated February 29, 2020. It peaked atop the chart the following week and maintained the lead position for three consecutive weeks. In Malaysia, the song debuted atop the RIM Charts, while the Sia remix peaked at number five on the chart.

In the United States, "On" debuted at number four on the Billboard Hot 100, becoming the highest-charting song by a Korean group in the country, with over 86,000 digital downloads sold in its release week. It ranked at number 68 in its second week and left the chart afterwards.

Music videos

Kinetic Manifesto Film: Come Prima

The first music video, dubbed "Kinetic Manifesto Film: Come Prima", was released on February 21, 2020, in conjunction with the release of the single and the album. It shows BTS, World of Dance Season 2 champions The Lab, and the Blue Devils Drum and Bugle Corps performing the choreography near the Sepulveda Dam, adding a dance break that is now continuously used for promotion.

It was the seventh most-watched online video in the first 24 hours, and the fifth most-watched YouTube video at the time; it gained 46.5 million views in this time frame.

Music video
The second official music video was released on February 28, 2020 at 0:00 KST. Within minutes of its release, the video became the biggest YouTube premiere of all time with 1.54 million concurrent viewers. The video reached 10 million views in one hour, surpassing the record held by "Boy With Luv" as the fastest Korean video to achieve this. The video contains references to various films and television shows, including The Maze Runner, Bird Box, The Handmaid's Tale, The Lion King, Game of Thrones, Narnia, and Dolittle. The video also includes a reference to the Biblical stories of Noah's Ark and Adam and Eve. The music video garnered 43.8 million views on its first day, surpassing Taylor Swift's "Look What You Made Me Do" as the seventh most-viewed video on YouTube in the first 24 hours. After a number of fans on social media accused YouTube of removing millions of views from the video, presenting "a real-time tracker" as proof, the platform responded via Twitter that the disparity in the view count was a direct result of their verification process which determines whether views are real or bot-generated and then filters them accordingly. The music video became BTS' 17th to cross 200 million views, doing so on October 16, 2020.

In the video, RM is shown standing before a ruined boat surrounded by various animals; Jin rescues an injured dove—which he later revives—from a war-torn battlefield; Suga stands in a middle of a cult; J-Hope is inside a forest filled with broken trees as Jungkook's dying body lies behind him; Jimin is near a boy with a drum; V takes a blindfold off of a little girl; and Jungkook is seen running from a prison wearing thorny handcuffs. In front of V, a stone gateway opens to reveal a rock that resembles Pride Rock in The Lion King. Everyone except Jungkook arrives at the gates, while Jungkook removes his handcuffs and blows into a conch shell before the video cuts to a fortified base where BTS performs the dance break as meteors fall down around them. Trees around the rock began to shape into place, and Jungkook finds the group as they ascend the rock. The video ends with the text "No More Dream" (their debut single) that fades into only "Dream".

The making of the second video was released on March 2, 2020.

Credits and personnel
Credits adapted from liner notes of Map of the Soul: 7.

 BTS – primary vocals
 Pdogg – production, songwriting, keyboard, synthesizer,  vocal arrangement, rap arrangement, recording engineer, digital editing
 RM – songwriting, rap arrangement, recording engineer
 Antonina Armato – songwriting
 August Rigo – songwriting
 J-Hope – songwriting
 Julia Ross – songwriting
 Krysta Youngs – songwriting
 Michel Schulz – songwriting
 Suga – songwriting
 Jungkook – chorus 
 Melanie Joy Fontana – songwriting, chorus 
 Paul Addleman – direction assistance
 Bianca Arriaga – drums 
 Del Atkins – bass 
 Emma Atkins – drums 
 Chris Badroos – horn 
 Duane Benjamin – orchestra conduction 
 Dedrick Bonner – choir direction, choir 
 Haley Breland – horn 
 Tym Brown – choir 
 Rastine Calhoun – horn 
 Christopher Calles – horn 
 Clayton Cameron – drums 
 Cherene Cexil – choir 
 Siobhan Chapman – drums 
 Matthew Chin – horn 
 Justin Cole – drums 
 Kayla Collins – choir 
 Meloney Collins – choir direction assistance 
 Jason de Leon – drums 
 DJ Riggins – mix engineer 

 Matthew Espinoza – horn 
 Ken Fisher – associate direction 
 James Ford – horn
 Kia Dawn Fulton – choir 
 Diana Greenwood – drum 
 Summer Greer – choir 
 Enniss Harris – horn 
 Spencer Hart – horn 
 Jaycen Joshua – mix engineer 
 Brenden Kersey-Wilson – horn 
 Moiro Konchellah – choir 
 Sam Kredich – horn 
 Evan Mackey – horn 
 Jesus Martinez – horn 
 Chadaé McAlister – choir 
 Collin McCrary – horn 
 Kevin McKeown – direction 
 Katie Osborn – horn 
 Marcus Perez – horn 
 Samuel Pounds – choir 
 Erik Reichers – recording engineer 
 Jacob Richards – mix engineer 
 Ken Sarah – drums 
 Max Seaberg – mix engineer 
 Walter Simonsen – drums 
 Michael Stranieri – horn 
 Joshua Von Bergmann – drums 
 Alex Williams – recording engineer 
 Amber Wright – choir 
 Young – guitar 
 Zakiya Young – choir

Charts

Weekly charts

Yearly

Accolades

Certifications

See also
 List of Billboard Hot 100 top-ten singles in 2020
 List of Gaon Digital Chart number ones of 2020
 List of M Countdown Chart winners (2020)
 List of number-one digital songs of 2020 (U.S.)
 List of number-one songs of 2020 (Malaysia)
 List of UK Independent Singles Chart number ones of 2020

References

2020 singles
2020 songs
BTS songs
Cultural depictions of Adam and Eve
Sia (musician) songs
Number-one singles in Malaysia
Songs written by August Rigo
Songs written by Antonina Armato
Songs written by Melanie Fontana
Songs written by Pdogg
Songs written by RM (rapper)
Songs written by J-Hope
Songs written by Suga (rapper)
Gaon Digital Chart number-one singles
Billboard Korea K-Pop number-one singles
Hybe Corporation singles